The Maceió Open (aka Chevrolet Classic or Chevrolet Open) is a defunct, ATP Tour affiliated men's tennis tournament. It was played for one year, in 1992 from February 3 to February 9. It was held in the coastal city of Maceió, Brazil at Praia da Pajuçara and was played on clay courts.

Finals

Singles

Doubles

References
Maceió Open

ATP Tour
Defunct tennis tournaments in Brazil
Clay court tennis tournaments